Annette Cowley-Nel (born 1967) is a retired international freestyle swimmer. She was born in South Africa to an English mother and lived in Boston, Bellville.

Her time in her Commonwealth trial was faster than the eventual gold medal time, and she would have been favourite to win the race.

In the 1986 she moved to the UK and hoped to represent England in the 100m Freestyle at the 1986 Commonwealth Games in Edinburgh; however, she was disqualified, with Zola Budd, on residency grounds. At the time, South Africa was subject to an international boycott in protest of the Apartheid government. The ban was upheld by the High Court, and Cowley-Nel was unable to compete. She was subsequently unable to compete for South Africa after the country's readmittance to international sport, as she had previously represented England.

She won the 1986 ASA National Championship 100 metres freestyle title and the 200 metres freestyle.

Personal life
Cowley-Nel is married to Jeremy Nel, with whom she owns Luxury Brands, a marketing and communications agency.

References 

1967 births
Living people
South African female swimmers
South African female freestyle swimmers
English female swimmers